Toni Foster (born October 16, 1971) is a former professional basketball player in the WNBA. She was the eighth pick in the 1997 WNBA Draft, being selected by the Phoenix Mercury.

College
Foster played for the Iowa Hawkeyes.

WNBA
Foster played with the Mercury from 1997 to 1999.

WNBA stats

References

External links
Toni Foster Bio - Hawkeye Sports Official Athletic Site

1971 births
Living people
All-American college women's basketball players
American women's basketball players
Basketball players from Memphis, Tennessee
Forwards (basketball)
Iowa Hawkeyes women's basketball players
Phoenix Mercury draft picks
Phoenix Mercury players